Aveline is a surname of French origin, derived from a given name, a diminutive of Ava. The surname is in turn the origin of the given name Evelyn.

In modern French, aveline means hazelnut. This is derived from the name of the Italian city of Avella, via the botanical name of the common hazel, Corylus avellana.

People

Surname
Claude Aveline (1901-1992), French writer and poet
 Jean-Marc Aveline (born 1958), Archbishop of Marseille 
 Joseph Aveline (1881-1958), French parliamentarian, mayor of Dorceau, and Percheron horse-breeder
Pierre Aveline (1656-1722), French engraver
Antoine Aveline (1691-1743), French engraver, son of Pierre
Pierre-Alexandre Aveline (1702-1760), French engraver, son of Pierre
William Talbot Aveline (1822-1903), British geologist and archaeologist.

Name
Aveline de Forz (1259-1274), British countess
Aveline de Grandpré, the protagonist of Ubisoft's Assassin's Creed III: Liberation.

Other
Aveline's Hole, a cave in Somerset, England
La Fée Aveline, a French comic by René Goscinny and Coq

See also
Avelina, female first name

French-language surnames